The 1970–71 Washington State Cougars men's basketball team represented Washington State University for the 1970–71 NCAA college basketball season. Led by thirteenth-year head coach Marv Harshman, the Cougars were members of the Pacific-8 Conference and played their home games on campus at Bohler Gymnasium in Pullman, Washington.

At the end of the season, assistant Jud Heathcote became head coach at the University of Montana.

A fixture in Pullman since 1958, Harshman departed in June for rival Washington in Seattle. Bob Greenwood, an assistant at Iowa and former head coach at Washington University in St. Louis, was hired in July.

References

External links
Sports Reference – Washington State Cougars: 1970–71 basketball season

Washington State Cougars men's basketball seasons
Washington State Cougars
Washington State
Washington State